Siegfried Susser (born 12 July 1953) is a German former professional footballer who played as a forward.

References

External links
 Siegfried Susser at racingstub.com 
 
 

1953 births
Living people
German footballers
Association football forwards
Ligue 1 players
Bundesliga players
2. Bundesliga players
1. FC Nürnberg players
SC Freiburg players
Stuttgarter Kickers players
RC Strasbourg Alsace players
SpVgg Greuther Fürth players
German expatriate footballers
German expatriate sportspeople in France
Expatriate footballers in France